W.J. Mouat Secondary is a public secondary school located in Abbotsford, British Columbia, Canada. The school was recognized in the August 23, 2004 edition of MacLean's magazine as one of the "Ten Most Innovative Schools in Canada."

W. J. Mouat has around 1,500 students between grades 9 and 12 and is the largest school in Abbotsford.

Athletics
Recent football titles:
 2000 Varsity 'AAA' Finalists
 2001 JV 'AAA' Champions
 2002 Varsity 'AAA' Champions
 2005 Varsity 'AAA' Champions
 2006 JV 'AAA' Finalists
 2008 JV 'AAA' Champions
 2008 Varsity 'AAA' Finalists
 2009 Varsity 'AAA' Finalists

Recent Basketball titles:
 2011 Senior Girls 'AAA' Champions
 2013 Junior Girls Provincial Champions

Recent Rugby titles:
 2018 Senior Boys Rugby 'AAA' Provincial Champions 
 2018 Girls Rugby 'AA' Provincial Champions

Notable alumni

 Akam (wrestler), Professional Wrestler
 Jarrod Bacon, Convicted Gangster of the Red Scorpions
 Ian Casselman, drummer for the Canadian rock band Marianas Trench
 Matthew Chapdelaine, Canadian Football League player
 Ryan Craig, NHL Player - Tampa Bay Lightning
 Evangeline Lilly, TV Star
 Kelly Lochbaum, Canadian Football League player
 Boseko Lokombo, Canadian Football League player
 Dion Pellerin, football player
 Mauro Ranallo, Sports Commentator
 Sophie Schmidt, Women's Canadian Olympic Soccer Team Player
 Drew Ray Tanner, Actor

References

External links 
 W. J. Mouat Secondary School
 Hawks Football website

High schools in Abbotsford, British Columbia
Educational institutions in Canada with year of establishment missing